The Marxist–Leninist Communist Party of Benin is a communist party in Benin led by Magloire Yansunnu. PCMLB was founded in Cotonou 1999. Yansunnu had been expelled from the Communist Party of Benin in 1998 following an internal schism in that party.

PCMLB was the 112th political party to be legally registered in Benin.

1999 establishments in Benin
Communist parties in Benin
Anti-revisionist organizations
Hoxhaist parties
Political parties established in 1999
Political parties in Benin